Suluova District is a district of Amasya Province of Turkey. Its seat is the town Suluova. Its area is 456 km2, and its population is 47,066 (2021).

Composition
There is one municipality in Suluova District:
 Suluova

There are 40 villages in Suluova District:

 Akören
 Alabedir
 Armutlu
 Arucak
 Aşağıkarasu
 Ayrancı
 Bayırlı
 Boyalı
 Çayüstü
 Çukurören
 Derebaşalan
 Dereköy
 Deveci
 Eğribük
 Eraslan
 Gürlü
 Harmanağılı
 Kanatpınar
 Kapancı
 Karaağaç
 Kazanlı
 Kerimoğlu
 Kılıçaslan
 Kıranbaşalan
 Kolay
 Kulu
 Küpeli
 Kurnaz
 Kutlu
 Kuzalan
 Oğulbağı
 Ortayazı
 Özalakadı
 Salucu
 Saygılı
 Seyfe
 Soku
 Uzunoba
 Yolpınar
 Yüzbeyi

References

Districts of Amasya Province